János Kende (born 22 September 1941) is a Hungarian cinematographer. He has worked on more than 60 films since 1967. He was a member of the jury at the 27th Moscow International Film Festival.

Selected filmography
 Red Psalm (1972)
 Voyage with Jacob (1972)
 Petőfi '73 (1973)
 Electra, My Love (1974)
 Hungarian Rhapsody (1979)
 Mathias Sandorf (1979, TV series)
 Forbidden Relations (1983)
 Jesus Christ's Horoscope (1989)
 Jonah Who Lived in the Whale (1993)
 Rua Alguem 5555: My Father (2003)

References

External links

1941 births
Living people
Hungarian cinematographers
Mass media people from Marseille